

References

Further reading 
 
 

N